Jack Mull (born September 29, 1943 in Chambersburg, Pennsylvania) is a former minor league baseball catcher, a major league coach, and minor league manager, and is currently a minor league coach.

Career
Mull began his pro career with the Quincy Cubs in 1969 and played in the minors until 1973.  He managed the GCL Cubs in 1974, then returned to AAA as a player in 1975 and 1976. In 1985, Mull was a coach for the San Francisco Giants.

Recent Minor League coaching assignments 
2001-2002 Buffalo Bisons
2003 Burlington Indians
2004 Lake County Captains
2005 Mahoning Valley Scrappers
2006 Lake County Captains

Year-by-Year Managerial Record

External links 
 Bio

1943 births
Living people
Major League Baseball bullpen coaches
Minor league baseball managers
People from Chambersburg, Pennsylvania
San Francisco Giants coaches
Quincy Cubs players
San Antonio Missions players
Midland Cubs players
Phoenix Giants players
Baseball players from Pennsylvania